Asuran is a 2019 Indian Tamil-language action drama film written and directed by Vetrimaaran and produced by Kalaipuli S. Thanu. It is based on the novel Vekkai by Poomani. The film stars Dhanush, along with Manju Warrier (in her Tamil debut), Ken Karunas, and Teejay Arunasalam. G. V. Prakash Kumar composed the film's music. Cinematography was handled by Velraj, with editing by R. Ramar.

Asuran was released in theatres on 4 October 2019. The film was a commercial success at the box office. The film won two awards at the 67th National Film Awards—Best Feature Film in Tamil and Best Actor (Dhanush). It was one among the ten Indian films to be screened at the 78th Golden Globe Awards (2021) under the Best Foreign Film category. It was also screened at the 51st International Film Festival of India in the Indian Panorama section. The film was remade in Telugu as Narappa (2021).

Plot
In the late 1970s Tirunelveli, a man and a boy are trekking across a river, carrying homemade bombs. In another part of the village, a woman, man and a girl are also hiding from the police. 

Past: The narrator reveals that the man is Sivasaami and the boy is his son Chidambaram. In contrast, the woman, man, and child are Sivasaami's wife, Pachaiyamma, her brother Murugesan and daughter Lakshmi. They also had an older son called Velmurugan. They are a family of farmers living in Thekkoor (lit. southern village). Sivasaami has a close relationship with his older son but is distant, almost abusive with Chidambaram. Sivasaami's family, along with most residents of Thekkoor, are Dalits. Narasimhan is an upper-caste landlord from Vadakoor (lit. northern village), who needs Sivasaami's 3 acres of land for a factory, to which the family is against selling, especially Velmurugan. 

Pachaiyamma is attacked by one of Narasimhan's sons, to which Velmurugan retaliates by severely injuring him and his men and gets imprisoned consequently. Sivasaami pleads with Narasimhan to get Velmurugan released, and in reply, Narasimhan asks Sivasaami to prostrate before every male resident of the landlord's village as atonement. When Velmurugan hears of his father's humiliation, he beats Narasimhan with a slipper. In revenge, Narasimhan's henchmen, led by a hunter Kariyan, behead Velmurugan and dumps his headless body naked in their field. Pachaiyamma is broken with inability to even complain because of the missing head as evidence and after a year, Chidambaram is compelled to kill Narasimhan in revenge. Sivasaami sees the killing, cuts the street lights there, and tells the family, where they flee with Chidambaram.

Present: Kariyan is asked to find the pair, tracks them down, and almost kills Chidambaram. Sivasaami defeats them all but kills none. While the two recovers, Sivasaami explains why he spared their lives. 

Past: 20 years before, he was a village-famous moonshine brewer and trusted servant to Viswanathan, a landlord. One day, he convinces his boss to employ Pandiyan, Viswanathan's distant relative, as a clerk. Sivasaami's brother Murugan and Venugopal Seshadri, a Brahmin Communist lawyer, are attempting to regain their community's Panchami land from landlords who had seized it illegally. Sivasaami's elder sister's daughter Mariyamma proposes to Sivasaami, who accepts. The family also accepts. Pandiyan slowly gains Viswanathan's trust and becomes his Mill accountant. 

Meanwhile, Sivasaami slowly falls in love with Mariyamma. When Sivasaami gives her sandals to wear, Pandiyan hits her and forces her to walk through the village with the sandals on her head. Sivasaami retaliates by hitting him with sandals in the middle of the village and ties him up, but is reprimanded by Vishwanathan. Sivasaami quits brewing and joins his brother. One night, before a meeting was conducted by Seshadri and Murugan with the other labourers, news arrives that Seshadri was arrested, and Sivasaami is sent to get the documents authorising the meeting. When Sivasaami returns, Murugan and the others have been killed by Pandiyan and his men, while Sivasaami's family (including Mariyamma), along with many others, are burned alive in their huts. 

Enraged, Sivasami brutally kills Vishwanathan, Pandiyan and their men. Sivasaami leaves his village and months later was found by Murugesan, who taught him farming. He's also introduced to Pachaiyamma, who is not getting marriage proposals. He narrates his story, and Pachaiyamma admires what he did for his family. He surrenders to the court and is given a light sentence. Afterwards, he marries Pachaiyamma. 

Present: Chidambaram is amazed at his father's past and starts to admire him. Sivasaami reconciles with his wife and daughter briefly, and he and his son go to Seshadri for help. Seshadri agrees to help them as long as they turn up to court the next day. The next day, the two get into the court premises but are forced to flee after Narasimhan's men ambush them. Sivasaami reluctantly sells his land to prevent Narasimhan's men from targeting his family. However, Chidambaram is abducted and tortured, in direct violation of the agreement. Sivasaami kills many of the henchmen and all of Narasimhan's family male members, though he and Chidambaram sustain serious injuries. 

Murugesan and their village people arrive armed and defuse the situation. The two villages agreed that the conflict should end and prevented a caste clash. Sivasaami's family has gathered in the court, and he has agreed to go to prison instead of Chidambaram if necessary. He tells his son to study hard and get a powerful bureaucratic job, and that, unlike land and money, the landlords can't seize their education, where Sivasaami smiles at his family as he enters the court.

Cast 

 Dhanush as Sivasaami, a villager
 Manju Warrier as Pachaiyamal, Sivasaami's wife
 Ken Karunas as Chidambaram, Sivasaami's and Pachaiyamal's younger son
 Teejay Arunasalam as Velmurugan, Sivasaami's and Pachaiyamal's elder son
 Pasupathy as Murugesan, Pachaiyamal's elder brother
 Prakash Raj as Venugopal Seshadri, a lawyer
 Ammu Abhirami as Maariammal, Sivasaami's cousin
 Balaji Sakthivel as Inspector
 Subramaniam Siva as Murugan, Sivasaami's brother
 Aadukalam Naren as Vaddakuran Narasimhan, a landlord
 Pawan as Venkatesan, Vaddakuran's younger brother
 Bala Hasan R. as Rajesh Narasimman, Vaddakuran's son
 S. R. Pandiyan as Hunter
 A. Venkatesh as Viswanathan
 Nitish Veera as Pandiyan
 Velraj as Panchayat Member
 Sendrayan as Pechimuthu, a cobbler
 Munnar Ramesh

Production

Development 
After the release of Velaiilla Pattadhari 2 (2017), producer Kalaipuli S. Thanu signed a three-film deal with Dhanush. After the success of Vada Chennai (2018), Vetrimaaran announced plans for making the film's sequel with Dhanush reprising his role. However, Vetrimaaran and Dhanush agreed to do another film for Thanu before working on the sequel. 

On 21 December 2018, Dhanush announced the film's title, with a poster. Filming was planned as to shoot in January 2019. G. V. Prakash Kumar was signed as the music compose, collaborating with the director and actor after Polladhavan (2007) and Aadukalam (2011). The film was reported to be set in 1960s to 1980s period, with Dhanush playing a man of his mid-40s.

Casting 
Malayalam actress Manju Warrier was cast in the female lead role after Jyothika rejected the role due to unavailability in the film, which marked her debut in Tamil film industry. Ken Karunas, son of actor Karunas and singer Teejay Arunasalam was roped into essay the role of Dhanush's sons in the film, with the latter marking his acting debut. Sai Pallavi was approached for a role, which later went to Ammu Abhirami. Director Balaji Sakthivel, also made his acting debut, essaying an important role in the film. Pasupathy was cast in a supporting role. He joined the sets in February 2019. Later, Aadukalam Naren and Pawan were also cast in the film.

Filming 
Principal photography of the film began on 26 January 2019, with the first schedule of the shoot being held at Tirunelveli. Dhanush was reported to play a dual role of father and son in the film as per sources. Initially, the actor was reported to play a dual role in another film directed by R. S. Durai Senthilkumar, which was titled Pattas (2020). While the film's shoot was progressing in full swing, Dhanush was reported to kick start his shoot for Pattas, later he took a break and resumed shooting for the film in April 2019. The final schedule of the film began in May 2019. It was revealed that the makers planned to wrap the film's shoot by June 2019.

Music 

The soundtrack album and background score is composed by G. V. Prakash Kumar, collaborating with Dhanush and Vetrimaaran for the third time after Polladhavan and Aadukalam. The soundtrack album consists of seven songs, with lyrics written by Ekadesi, Yugabharathi, Eknath, and Arunraja Kamaraj. The film's album was launched on 2 September 2019, coinciding with the occasion of Ganesh Chathurthi at a launch event held at Prasad Studios in Chennai, where Dhanush, Manju Warrier, Ammu Abirami, Ken Karunas, singer-turned-actor Teejay Arunasalam, director Vetrimaaran, composer G. V. Prakash Kumar, and producer S. Thanu were in attendance, and the album was released in all streaming platforms and on YouTube, the same day. The film's music, including the background score, received positive responses from both audiences as well as critics, with songs "Kathari Poovazhagi", "Yen Minukki" and "Ellu Vaya Pookalaye" were well received by audiences, benefiting to the success of the film.

Release 
Asuran was originally planned to be released on 2 October 2019, coinciding with the occasion of Gandhi Jayanti and the weekend of the Vijayadashami festival in India. On 8 August, the makers advanced the release date by one day to 4 October.

Reception

Critical reception 
Asuran received critical acclaim.

Sify rated the film 4.5 out of 5, summarising that "Asuran is a must-watch. Dhanush-Vetrimaaran combo who has once again delivered a raw, rustic, and riveting revenge drama. Don't miss this one!" S. Subhakeerthana from The Indian Express rated the film 4 out of 5 and reviewed it as "With this Dhanush starrer, Vetrimaaran proves he's one of the finest directors in Indian cinema, yet again. Only a few filmmakers like him can pull off a mainstream cinema, balancing 'realism' and commercial elements."

Sreedhar Pillai from Firstpost rated the film 4 out of 5 and posted a verdict " Asuran is one of the best films of the year and a must-watch. Vetrimaran keeps the flag of good cinema flying high." Janani K from India Today, rated the film 3.5 out of 5 and stated that "Director Vetri Maaran's Asuran is a thrilling revenge drama of an oppressed family in a village. With solid writing backed by brilliant performances, Asuran is a classic film."

The Times of India, rated 3.5 out of 5 stars, stating that "Vetri Maaran delivers yet another solid action drama that keeps us engrossed from start to finish." Behindwoods rated 3.25/5, stating that "Asuran is an engaging watch with strong performances, interesting plot and an amazing emotional connect with the audience throughout." Krupa Ge from Silverscreen said, "Asuran is a bloody revenge saga, that's also weirdly enough about the futility of violence... Watching the film, after reading the book [Vekkai], feels like dipping in and out of the novel, to wander off to the sides of the pages, filled with detours and notes. It starts where the novel starts, but goes back and forth, imagining what could have been."

Gauthaman Baskaran from News18, gave contrary reviews by rating the film 2 out of 5, stating that "Coming at a time when graphic and lurid on-screen violence is being questioned and even condemned, Asuran would appear needlessly falling back to the old formula." Baradwaj Rangan of Film Companion South wrote, "None of the characters feel fully formed because the timelines feel rushed. We don't feel time and lives weigh down on us the way it did in Vada Chennai or Visaranai. Maybe it's the on/off voiceovers, which feel like hastily applied band-aids over sore spots in the storytelling. But the bigger absence is the lack of set pieces. Vetri Maaran seems to be holding back almost deliberately, as though mirroring his leading man".

A critic from the HuffPost wrote that the film has taken inspiration from Kilvenmani massacre of 1968, using as a plot device.

Box office
Asuran grossed approximately 16 crore in Tamil Nadu in its first weekend. The film collected  in Kerala in 10 days. The film grossed over 50 crore worldwide according to Firstpost. The film has crossed  revenue which includes theatrical gross and non-theatrical revenue such as satellite, digital and music rights.

Accolades

Remake 
Asuran was remade in Telugu as Naarappa in 2021, starring Venkatesh and directed by Srikanth Addala. Kalaipuli S. Thanu returned as the producer of the film along with Daggubati Suresh Babu under their banners V. Creations and Suresh Productions.

References

External links 
 

2019 films
2010s Tamil-language films
2019 action drama films
Films based on Indian novels
Films scored by G. V. Prakash Kumar
Indian films about revenge
Tamil films remade in other languages
Indian historical action films
2010s historical action films
Films directed by Vetrimaaran
Films about the caste system in India